Joseph Georg Friedrich Ernst Karl, Duke of Saxe-Altenburg (27 August 1789, in Hildburghausen – 25 November 1868, in Altenburg), was a Duke of Saxe-Altenburg.

Biography

He was the second but first surviving son of Frederick, Duke of Saxe-Hildburghausen (of Saxe-Altenburg from 1826) and Duchess Charlotte Georgine of Mecklenburg-Strelitz. Joseph succeeded his father as Duke of Saxe-Altenburg after his death in 1834.

In 1814, he and his brother George fought with the allies against France in the Napoleonic Wars. Later, he was a General Major in Saxon services.

He implemented several buildings in Altenburg, but his government was considered conservative and resistant to reform; for this, he was forced to abdicate during the civil revolution of 1848.

Marriage and issue
In Kirchheim unter Teck on 24 April 1817, Joseph married Amelia of Württemberg, a daughter of Duke Louis of Württemberg. They had six daughters:
Marie (b. Hildburghausen, 14 April 1818 – d. Gmunden, 9 January 1907), married on 18 February 1843 to King George V of Hanover.
 Pauline (b. Kirchheim unter Teck, 24 November 1819 – d. Hildburghausen, 11 January 1825).
 Therese (b. Hildburghausen, 9 October 1823 – d. Altenburg, 3 April 1915).
 Elisabeth (b. Hildburghausen, 26 March 1826 – d. Oldenburg, 2 February 1896), married on 10 February 1852 to Peter II, Grand Duke of Oldenburg.
Alexandra [upon her marriage, she took the name Alexandra Iosifovna in a Russian Orthodox baptism] (b. Altenburg, 8 July 1830 – d. St. Petersburg, 6 July 1911), married on 11 September 1848 to Grand Duke Konstantin Nikolayevich of Russia.
Luise (b. Altenburg, 4 June 1832 – d. Hummelshain, 29 August 1833).

Ancestry

Honours 
He received the following orders and decorations:

References

1789 births
1868 deaths
House of Saxe-Altenburg
Dukes of Saxe-Altenburg
People from Hildburghausen
German military personnel of the Napoleonic Wars
Generals of Infantry (Prussia)
Princes of Saxe-Altenburg
Recipients of the Order of the White Eagle (Russia)
Recipients of the Order of St. Anna, 1st class
Military personnel from Thuringia